The 25th Dáil was elected at the 1987 general election on 17 February 1987 and met on 10 March 1987. The members of Dáil Éireann, the house of representatives of the Oireachtas (legislature), of Ireland are known as TDs. The 25th Dáil was dissolved by President Patrick Hillery on 25 May 1989, at the request of the Taoiseach Charles Haughey. The 25th Dáil lasted  days. There were no by-elections during the 25th Dáil.

Composition of the 25th Dáil

Fianna Fáil, denoted with bullet, formed the 20th Government of Ireland.

Graphical representation
This is a graphical comparison of party strengths in the 25th Dáil from March 1987. This was not the official seating plan.

Ceann Comhairle
On 10 March 1987, Seán Treacy (Ind) was proposed by Charles Haughey and seconded by Brian Lenihan for the position of Ceann Comhairle. He was approved without a vote.

TDs by constituency
The list of the 166 TDs elected is given in alphabetical order by Dáil constituency.

Changes

See also
Members of the 18th Seanad

References

External links
Houses of the Oireachtas: Debates: 25th Dáil

 
25th Dáil
25